August Erne (15 February 1905 – 15 October 1987) was a Swiss racing cyclist. He was the Swiss National Road Race champion in 1932. He also rode in the 1932 and 1934 Tour de France.

References

External links
 

1905 births
1987 deaths
People from Zurzach District
Swiss male cyclists
Sportspeople from Aargau
Tour de Suisse stage winners